This is a list of Category A listed buildings in the New Town of Edinburgh, Scotland.

For the main list, see List of Category A listed buildings in Edinburgh.

Boundaries

The New Town is defined here as the area shown in light brown on the map to the right, with some small exceptions:

 to the north, a line along St. Stephen Street, Fettes Row, Royal Crescent, and Bellevue Crescent, then along East London Street
This includes Royal Crescent, Scotland Street and Bellevue Crescent, which are omitted from the map area
 to the west, Queensferry Street and Great Stuart Street, through Moray Place up Gloucester Street
All buildings on Randolph Crescent, Ainslie Place, and Moray Place have been included.
 to the east, Annandale Street (south of the East London Street roundabout) to Elm Row/Leith Walk, then along Royal Terrace to where Carlton Terrace Brae meets Regent Road
This encompasses the Gayfield Square area and all of the structures on Calton Hill, as well as the very southern end of Leith Walk. It does not, however, include the buildings around Montgomery Street to the north of London Road
 to the south, the southern edge of Princes Street Gardens, Waverley Station, then along Regent Road
This includes all structures in Princes Street Gardens and the lower parts of the Mound, with a boundary running approximately along Market Street, and includes Waverley Station as well as the Balmoral Hotel and the old Post Office building at the north end of North Bridge. At the west, it includes St Cuthbert's Church, and at the eastern end includes all buildings on Calton Hill to the north of Regent Road, including the old Royal High School.

Listed buildings 

|}

Notes

References

Bibliography

 Scottish Pioneers of the Greek Revival, The Scottish Georgian Society, 1984
 Clarisse Godard Desmarest, The New Town of Edinburgh: An Architectural Celebration, John Donald, 2019
 New Town Conservation Area Character Appraisal, Edinburgh City council, n.d. (PDF)
 J.Gifford, C.McWilliam, D.Walker, The Buildings of Scotland: Edinburgh, Penguin, 1984
 George Gordon (ed.), Perspectives of the Scottish City, Elsevier, 1985
 Anthony Lewis, The Builders of Edinburgh New Town 1767-1795, Spire Books, 2014
 Ian G. Lindsay, Georgian Edinburgh, Oliver and Boyd, 1948
 Charles McKean, Edinburgh: An Illustrated Architectural Guide, Rutland Press, 1992
 Kirsten Carter McKee, Calton Hill: And the plans for Edinburgh’s Third New Town, John Donald, 2018
 Ray McKenzie, Public Sculpture of Edinburgh (Volume 2): The New Town, Leith and the Outer Suburbs, Liverpool University Press, 2018
 Fiona Pearson, Virtue and Vision: Sculpture and Scotland 1540-1990, National Galleries of Scotland, 1991
 A. J. Youngson, The Making of Classical Edinburgh, Edinburgh University Press, 1966

Edinburgh
Category A listed buildings
New Town, Edinburgh